Patty Fendick and Meredith McGrath were the defending champions, but did not compete this year. Fendick retired from professional tennis during this season, while McGrath competed at the WTA Tour Championships, which was held at the same week.

Jill Hetherington and Kristine Radford won the title by defeating Kristin Godridge and Nana Miyagi 2–6, 6–4, 6–3 in the final.

Seeds

Draw

Draw

References
 Official results archive (ITF)
 Official results archive (WTA)

Doubles
Volvo Women's Open - Doubles
 in women's tennis